Madhuca prolixa is a tree in the family Sapotaceae. The specific epithet prolixa means "expanded", referring to the inflorescences.

Description
The bark is greyish brown. Inflorescences bear up to eight flowers.

Distribution and habitat
Madhuca prolixa is endemic to Borneo. Its habitat is lowland mixed dipterocarp forest from  altitude.

Conservation
Madhuca prolixa has been assessed as near threatened on the IUCN Red List. The species is threatened by logging and conversion of land for palm oil plantations.

References

prolixa
Endemic flora of Borneo
Plants described in 1908